Joseph Wearmouth (4 June 1878 – 1 June 1925) was an Australian rules footballer who played with St Kilda in the Victorian Football League (VFL).

Notes

External links 

1878 births
1925 deaths
Australian rules footballers from Victoria (Australia)
St Kilda Football Club players
Stawell Football Club players